Syed Abu Muawiyah Abuzar Bukhari (سید ابو معاویہ ابوذر بخاری, died 24 October 1995) (real name: Syed Ata-ul-Mun'im Bukhari) was a Muslim Pakistani scholar, intellectual, orator, poet, writer, and a former president of Majlis-e-Ahrar-e-Islam. He was a prominent figure of the freedom movement of undivided India. Bukhari was the elder son of Syed Ata Ullah Shah Bukhari and was a leader of Majlis-e-Ahrar-e-Islam being elected multiple times as a President or Secretary General of the Ahrar Party. Bukhari was also founder of Majlis-e-Khuddam-e-sahabah and had an important role in Tehreek-e-Khatme Nabuwwat 1953, 1974 and 1984.

Bukhari assembled a  conference in 1962 on the day of the death of Hazrat Ameer-e-Muavia at Qasim Bagh Multan. On multiple occasions, Bukhari was arrested due to anti-government religious and political speech. He was also editor of the monthly news corporation, Al-Ahrar published from Lahore and Multan. Bukhari was also a poet; his PHD thesis has been written on his Persian book Kaan Parsi in Iran.

Death
Bukhari died on 24 October 1995 in Multan. He was buried in Multan near his father's (Syed Ata Ullah Shah Bukhari) grave.

References

20th-century Indian Muslims
Pakistani Sunni Muslims
Deobandis
Persian-language poets
Writers from Patna
People from Multan
1995 deaths
Presidents of Majlis-e-Ahrar-ul-Islam
Secretary Generals of Majlis-e-Ahrar-ul-Islam

ur:سید عطاء اللہ شاہ بخاری